In statistics, extensions of Fisher's method are a group of approaches that allow approximately valid statistical inferences to be made when the assumptions required for the direct application of Fisher's method are not valid. Fisher's method is a way of combining the information in the p-values from different statistical tests so as to form a single overall test: this method requires that the individual test statistics (or, more immediately, their resulting p-values) should be statistically independent.

Dependent statistics

A principal limitation of Fisher's method is its exclusive design to combine independent p-values, which renders it an unreliable technique to combine dependent p-values. To overcome this limitation, a number of methods were developed to extend its utility.

Known covariance

Brown's method

Fisher's method showed that the log-sum of k independent p-values follow a χ2-distribution with 2k degrees of freedom:

 

In the case that these p-values are not independent, Brown proposed the idea of approximating X using a scaled χ2-distribution, cχ2(k’), with k’ degrees of freedom.

The mean and variance of this scaled χ2 variable are:

 
 

This approximation is shown to be accurate up to two moments.

Unknown covariance

Harmonic mean p-value 

The harmonic mean p-value offers an alternative to Fisher's method for combining p-values when the dependency structure is unknown but the tests cannot be assumed to be independent.

Kost's method: t approximation 

This method requires the test statistics' covariance structure to be known up to a scalar multiplicative constant.

Cauchy combination test 

This is conceptually similar to Fisher's method: it computes a sum of transformed p-values. Unlike Fisher's method, which uses a log transformation to obtain a test statistic which has a chi-squared distribution under the null, the Cauchy combination test uses a tan transformation to obtain a test statistic whose tail is asymptotic to that of a Cauchy distribution under the null. The test statistic is:

 

Under the null,  are uniformly distributed, therefore  are Cauchy distributed. More precisely, letting W denote a standard Cauchy random variable:

 

This leads to a combined hypothesis test, in which X is compared to the quantiles of the Cauchy distribution.

References

Multiple comparisons